In-Fest is a mini indoor music festival in the UK.

In-Fest is short for "Indoor Festival" it is known to feature up and coming rock bands from all over the UK.
The festival features metal, punk, and rock bands.

The events are presented by Rebellious Noise (also known as RNevents) a promotions company in the UK.

History 
The original concept for the first In-Fest was so that bands could get some experience playing live and get footage recorded of themselves to use for promotional purposes. It was created by Scott Warren who is the Vocalist/Guitarist for the band F3tch. Scott got a team of friends and family members to help organize the show.  After the success of In-Fest1, In-Fest2 was organized.

In-Fest1
In-Fest1 was a strict invite only event with only local bands and got far bigger than expected.
In-Fest1 featured bands such as:
Zombies for Hire
Airborn (Aces Wild)
The Dark Knights
Ollie & The Twists
F3tch

In-Fest2

In late 2007, Scott decided to turn his promotional efforts into a promo company with a name. Rebellious Noise was born and quickly became recognised with local bands. Rebellious Noise decided to put on In-Fest2 and gather bigger bands and do everything bigger than last time.

In-Fest2 Was held at a bigger venue this time called "The Space" on the Isle of Dogs in east London.

The bands that appeared at In-Fest2 were:
Monday Massacre
Publicasylum
F3tch
Hearts in Atlantis
Came by Plane
The Autumn Start

The show was a huge success and proved just how much the In-Fest series was growing. Many of the people that went to the show were stunned as to how good the show turned out to be. All of the bands have mentioned how they loved the crowd and that they want to come back for future events, Some even named it as the best gig they had done so far.

The show was also filmed on a number of cameras, however, due to the quality of sound there is confusion how the footage will be released. Rebellious Noise have stated that they may release a DVD that would feature highlights from the show or they may put highlight clips online through the company's website.

In-Fest3
As soon as In-fest2 was over there were many people asking about In-Fest3. Rebellious Noise confirmed that there would be a In-Fest3 and told people to expect the series to carry on expanding. In early 2010, Rebellious Noise launched the home page of RNevents.com and the official Facebook page with announcements that In-Fest3 news would be on its way.

In-Fest3 had the following line up:
Black Polaris
Cuter in the dark
F3tch
Aces Wild
Saifa
Two Days Time
Flowers for her Grave

In-Fest3 took place on 8 May 2010 in London, England at "The Space" which is the same venue Rebellious Noise used for In-Fest2. The event was a success and was considered the best In-Fest so far by many people in attendance.

In-Fest 4 
The fourth In-Fest event was announced in November 2010, set to take place on Monday 17 January 2011 at The Purple Turtle in London.

In-Fest 4 will feature:
Idiom
Seven Year Kismet
F3tch
Saifa
Red Button Exit
Rebellious Noise DJs

Extra information

Sub-Fest
In June 2010, Rebellious Noise began promoting a new show called "Sub-Fest", which would be the "Sub" show to their supershows "In-Fest".

Special performances and collaborations
Flowers for her grave ended their set at In-Fest3 with a cover from the band Bring me the horizon
Scott Warren from F3tch did a song with Ollie & The Twists at In-Fest1. Scott supplied lead vocals and O&TT singer Ben supplied backing vocals. They did a cover of the Rage Against the Machine song "Killing in the Name."
Wheeler from Publicasylum joined F3tch on stage at In-Fest2 to help perform backing vocals on a cover of the Deftones song "My Own Summer (Shove It)".
Phil from Monday Massacre and Scott Warren from F3tch joined Publicasylum on stage at In-Fest2 to help perform vocals on the Publicasylum song "Porphyria". The song hadn't been played frequently in their set, but had been recently brought back to play at this event.

External links 
In-Fest Official Myspace
Rebellious Noise Official Website
RNevents facebook page
Official F3tch Myspace
The Space (Venue For In-Fest2)
Article about In-Fest2 on My Village

Rock festivals in the United Kingdom